Alcalá de Henares is a railway station serving the city of Alcalá de Henares in the Community of Madrid, Spain. It is on the Madrid–Barcelona railway and is owned by Adif. The station is served by Cercanías Madrid lines C-2 and C-7.

References

Paisaje de la ciudad de Alcalá de Henares con la estación de ferrocarril en primer término Photo of the town of Alcalá de Henares with the railway station in the foreground, 1903.

External links

Buildings and structures in Alcalá de Henares
Railway stations in the Community of Madrid
Railway stations in Spain opened in 1859
Cercanías Madrid stations